The chain pump is type of a water pump in which several circular discs are positioned on an endless chain. One part of the chain dips into the water, and the chain runs through a tube, slightly bigger than the diameter of the discs. As the chain is drawn up the tube, water becomes trapped between the discs and is lifted to and discharged at the top. Chain pumps were used for centuries in the ancient Middle East, Europe, and China.

In the Near East and Europe
The earliest evidence for this device is in a Babylonian text from about 700 B.C. They were commonly powered by humans or animals. The device then appeared in ancient Egypt from about 200 B.C., featuring a pair of gear-wheels.

A version of the chain pump was used in Ancient Greek and Roman, sometimes with pots, or scoops fixed to the chain, which, as they passed over the top pulley, tipped the water out; a 2nd century example is preserved in London. Philo of Byzantium wrote of such a device in the 2nd century B.C.; the historian Vitruvius mentioned them around 30 B.C. Fragments of the cogs, crank, and discs, of a Bilge pump, from a 1st Century Roman barge, were unearthed at Lake Nemi.

Chain pumps were used in European mines during the Renaissance; mineralogist Georg Agricola illustrated them in his De re metallica (1556). They were used in dockyards, and several formed part of the Portsmouth Block Mills complex. Chain pumps were commonly used on naval vessels of the time to pump the bilges, and examples are known in the nineteenth century for low-lift irrigation.

China

Chain pumps were also used in ancient China from at least the 1st century A.D. In China, they were also called dragon backbones. One of the earliest accounts was a description by the Han Dynasty philosopher Wang Chong (A.D. 27–97) around A.D. 80. Unlike those found in the West, chain pumps in China resembled the square-pallet type instead of the pear-shaped bucket. Illustrations of such Chinese chain pumps show them drawing water up a slanted channel. These were sometimes powered by hydraulics of a rushing current against a horizontal water wheel acting against a vertical wheel, and others by a horizontal mechanical wheel acting upon a vertical wheel that was pulled by the labor of oxen. There were also square-pallet chain pumps operated by pedals.

From the 1st century onwards, chain pumps were widespread throughout the Chinese countryside. Chinese square-pallet chain pumps were used mostly for irrigation, though they found use in public works as well. The infamous Eastern Han court eunuch Zhang Rang (d. A.D. 189) once ordered the engineer Bi Lan (畢嵐) to construct a series of square-pallet chain pumps outside the capital city Luoyang. These chain pumps serviced the palaces and living quarters of the Luoyang; the water lifted by the chain pumps was brought in by a pipe system. Ma Jun, the renowned mechanical engineer of the Three Kingdoms era, also constructed a series of chain pumps for watering the palatial gardens of Emperor Ming of Wei (226–239).

During the period of agricultural expansion in Song China (10th-13th centuries CE), the technology of water-rising devices was improved. For some centuries they had been used for moving water for drainage or irrigation purposes. The simplest design, known as the counterbalanced bucket or 'swape' or 'well-sweep' was in common use at that time. A more complicated design, the 'square-pallet chain pump', was introduced several centuries before the growth in Song technology, but had not seen prior use for farming. They became more common around the end of the first millennium AD.

From the 13th century onwards, the Chinese also used windmills (acquired from the Middle East) to power square-pallet chain pumps. Yet there were other types of chain pumps besides the square-pallet design. In Song Yingxing's (1587–1666) encyclopedic book the Tiangong Kaiwu (1637), there is description and illustration of a cylinder chain pump, powered by waterwheels and leading water up from the river to an elevated plain of agricultural crops.

The contribution of chain pumps to agricultural growth during the Song was extolled by poets such as Li Chuquan (李处权) of the twelfth century. The Song government actively spread the technology, introducing pumping equipment and chain pumps to those areas as yet unfamiliar with the technique.

See also
Airlift pump
Chain drive
Rope pump
Sakia
Waterladder pump

Notes

References

Needham, Joseph (1986). Science and Civilization in China: Volume 4, Physics and Physical Technology, Part 2, Mechanical Engineering. Taipei: Caves Books, Ltd.
Needham, Joseph (1986). Science and Civilization in China: Volume 6, Biology and Biological Technology, Part 2, Agriculture. Taipei: Caves Books Ltd.
Song, Yingxing, translated with preface by E-Tu Zen Sun and Shiou-Chuan Sun (1966). T'ien-Kung K'ai-Wu: Chinese Technology in the Seventeenth Century. University Park: Pennsylvania State University Press.

Pumps
Ancient Egyptian technology
Ancient Roman technology
Chinese inventions
Greek inventions
Hydraulics